A script kiddie, skiddie, kiddie, or skid is an unskilled individual who uses scripts or programs developed by others, primarily for malicious purposes.

Characteristics
In a Carnegie Mellon report prepared for the U.K. Department of Defense in 2000, script kiddies are defined as The more immature but unfortunately often just as dangerous exploiter of security lapses on the Internet. The typical script kiddy uses existing and frequently well known and easy-to-find techniques and programs or scripts to search for and exploit weaknesses in other computers on the Internet—often randomly and with little regard or perhaps even understanding of the potentially harmful consequences.

Script kiddies have at their disposal a large number of effective, easily downloadable programs capable of breaching computers and networks.

Script kiddies vandalize websites both for the thrill of it and to increase their reputation among their peers.  Some more malicious script kiddies have used virus toolkits to create and propagate the Anna Kournikova and Love Bug viruses.
Script kiddies lack, or are only developing, programming skills sufficient to understand the effects and side effects of their actions. As a result, they leave significant traces which lead to their detection, or directly attack companies which have detection and countermeasures already in place, or in some cases, leave automatic crash reporting turned on.

See also
 Black hat hacker
 Exploit (computer security)
 Hacker (computer security)
Hacktivism
 Lamer
 List of convicted computer criminals
 Luser
 Noob 
 Web shell, a tool that script kiddies frequently use

References

Further reading
 
 
 The Art of Intrusion: The Real Stories Behind the Exploits of Hackers, Intruders and Deceivers (2005)

External links
 Honeynet.org - Know Your Enemy (Essay about script kiddies) preserved at Internet Archive
 Cracking the Hacker Mindset

Hacking (computer security)
Computing culture
Pejorative terms for people